Heinrich Ernst Kayser (16 April 1815 in Altona, Hamburg – 17 January 1888 in Hamburg) was a German violinist, violist, pedagogue and composer.

Selected works 
Grand duo concertant in B major for clarinet (or violin) and viola, Op. 2
36 Etudes for violin, Op. 20
Duo concertant for clarinet and viola, Op. 27 (1865)
Neueste Methode des Violinspiels, Op. 32
4 Sonatas for violin, Op. 33
36 Etudes for viola, Op. 43
Nouvelle méthode d'alto (New Viola Method; Neue Schule für Bratsche), Op. 54 (published c.1880)
4 Kinder-Sonatinen, Op. 58

1815 births
1888 deaths
19th-century classical composers
German classical composers
German classical violinists
Male classical violinists
German classical violists
German male classical composers
19th-century German composers
19th-century classical violinists
German violinists
German male violinists
19th-century German male musicians